Khoshk (also Romanized as Khoshg, Khsohk, and Khushk) is a village in Sedeh Rural District, Sedeh District, Qaen County, South Khorasan Province, Iran. At the 2006 census, its population was 737, in 305 families.

References 

Populated places in Qaen County